Ottó Zsolt Aubéli (born March 31, 1975 in Esztergom) is an amateur Hungarian freestyle wrestler, who played for the men's super heavyweight category. In 2005, he won two bronze medals at the World Championships in Budapest, Hungary, and at the European Championships in Varna, Bulgaria.

Aubeli made his official debut at the 2004 Summer Olympics in Athens, where he placed third in the preliminary pool of the men's 120 kg class, against Georgia's Alex Modebadze, and Russia's Kuramagomed Kuramagomedov.

At the 2008 Summer Olympics in Beijing, Aubeli reached the quarterfinal round of the 120 kg class by easily defeating Palau's Florian Skilang Temengil. He lost to former Olympic champion and Russian-born wrestler David Musuľbes of Slovakia, who was able to score four points in two straight periods, leaving Aubeli with a single point.

References

External links
Profile – International Wrestling Database
NBC 2008 Olympics profile

1975 births
Living people
Hungarian male sport wrestlers
Olympic wrestlers of Hungary
Wrestlers at the 2004 Summer Olympics
Wrestlers at the 2008 Summer Olympics
People from Esztergom
World Wrestling Championships medalists
Sportspeople from Komárom-Esztergom County
20th-century Hungarian people
21st-century Hungarian people